Anonychomyrma procidua is a species of ant in the genus Anonychomyrma. Described by Wilhelm Ferdinand Erichson in 1842, the species is endemic to Australia.

References

Anonychomyrma
Hymenoptera of Australia
Insects described in 1842